Silurichthys is a genus of sheatfishes native to Asia.

Some Silurichthys species are economically important as aquarium fishes, and many are useful biological indicators of the health of freshwater or peat swamp forests.

In Silurichthys species, the eyes are small and under the skin. It is likely sexual dimorphism is present in all species, based on species where there enough specimens available. Mature males of all species have a broad and somewhat flattened pectoral fin spine with "serrae" (saw-like teeth); in females and juveniles, the spine is slender and has no spines.

Species
There are currently nine recognized species in this genus:
Silurichthys citatus Ng & Kottelat, 1997
Silurichthys gibbiceps Ng & Ng, 1998
Silurichthys hasseltii Bleeker, 1858
Silurichthys indragiriensis Volz, 1904
Silurichthys ligneolus Ng & Tan, 2011 (Brown leaf catfish)
Silurichthys marmoratus Ng & Ng, 1998
Silurichthys phaiosoma (Bleeker, 1851)
Silurichthys sanguineus Roberts, 1989
Silurichthys schneideri Volz, 1904

References

Siluridae
Freshwater fish genera
Catfish genera
Taxa named by Pieter Bleeker